Elections to Hyndburn Borough Council, England were held on 10 June 2004. One third of the council was up for election and the Conservative party stayed in overall control of the council.

After the election, the composition of the council was
 Conservative 20
 Labour 15

Election result

Ward results

References 
 2004 Hyndburn election result
 Anti-war backlash
 Ward results

2004 English local elections
2004
2000s in Lancashire